Douglastown is a Canadian suburban neighbourhood in the city of Miramichi, New Brunswick.

Douglastown is home to the city of Miramichi's shopping district, which includes a large enclosed shopping mall, multiple strip malls and numerous other stores and businesses. It is anchored by; Walmart Canada, Winners, Giant Tiger, Mark's, Reitman's, EB Games, Bulk Barn, The Source by Circuit City, Canadian Tire, Sobeys, Shoppers Drug Mart, Easyhome, Sport Chek, Bluenotes, Pseudio, Ardenes, Northern Reflections, Bentley, Peoples Rogers Wireless, Bell, Telus, Pet Valu, Dollarama, Payless Shoe Store  and Staples Business Depot.

History
Prior to municipal amalgamation on January 1, 1995, Douglastown was an incorporated village in Northumberland County.

Douglastown was originally known as Gretna Green and was founded in 1812 by two Scottish immigrants, Alexander Rankin and James Gilmour.  The name changed after the Great Miramichi Fire of 1825 to honour Sir Howard Douglas (1776-1861), then the Lieutenant-Governor of New Brunswick.

The post office was established in 1835, but the community wasn't incorporated as a village until 1966.

Notable people

See also
List of communities in New Brunswick

References

External links

Neighbourhoods in Miramichi, New Brunswick
Populated places disestablished in 1995
Former villages in New Brunswick